The Juno Awards of 1993, representing Canadian music industry achievements of the previous year, were awarded on 21 March 1993 in Toronto at a ceremony in the O'Keefe Centre. Celine Dion was the host for the ceremonies, which were broadcast on CBC Television at 8 pm Toronto time. This year, all performers at the ceremonies would be Canadians, in contrast to some ceremonies in previous years.

Nominations were announced 9 February 1993. Celine Dion received 7 nominations, tying the record set by Bryan Adams at the 1992 awards. Bryan Adams and Tom Cochrane were prominent male nominees this year.

Nominees and winners

Canadian Entertainer of the Year
This award was chosen by a national poll rather than by Juno organisers CARAS.

Winner: The Tragically Hip

Other Nominees:
 Bryan Adams
 Barenaked Ladies
 Tom Cochrane
 Celine Dion

Best Female Vocalist
Winner: Celine Dion

Other Nominees:
 Sass Jordan
 k.d. lang
 Rita MacNeil
 Michelle Wright

Best Male Vocalist
Winner: Leonard Cohen

Other Nominees:
 Corey Hart
 Francis Martin
 Kim Mitchell
 Neil Young

Most Promising Female Vocalist
Winner: Julie Masse

Other Nominees:
 Lisa Brokop
 Sue Foley
 Sofia Shinas
 Priscilla Wright

Most Promising Male Vocalist
Winner: John Bottomley

Other Nominees:
 Devon
 Steve Fox
 John McDermott
 Don Neilson

Group of the Year
Winner: Barenaked Ladies

Other Nominees:
 54-40
 Blue Rodeo
 Les B.B.
 The Tragically Hip

Most Promising Group
Winner: Skydiggers

Other Nominees:
 Lost and Profound
 Pure
 Slik Toxik
 Sven Gali

Songwriter of the Year
Winner: k.d. lang and Ben Mink

Other Nominees:
 Bryan Adams
 Joan Besen
 Tom Cochrane
 Neil Young

Best Country Female Vocalist
Winner: Michelle Wright

Other Nominees:
 Lisa Brokop
 Patricia Conroy
 Susan Graham
 Sylvia Tyson

Best Country Male Vocalist
Winner: Gary Fjellgaard

Other Nominees:
 Larry Mercey
 Don Neilson
 Tom Russell
 Tim Taylor

Best Country Group or Duo
Winner: Tracey Prescott & Lonesome Daddy

Other Nominees:
 Country Hearts
 Gary Fjellgaard and Linda Kidder
 Rock 'N Horse Band
 Straight Clean & Simple

Best Instrumental Artist
Winner: Ofra Harnoy

Other Nominees:
 John Arpin
 Exchange (Steve Sexton and Gerald O'Brien)
 Manteca
 Skywalk

International Entertainer of the Year
Winner: U2

Other Nominees:
 Garth Brooks
 Genesis
 Red Hot Chili Peppers
 Bruce Springsteen

Best Producer
Winner: k.d. lang and Ben Mink with co-producer Greg Penny, "Constant Craving" and "The Mind Of Love"

Other Nominees:
 Leonard Cohen with co-producer Leanne Ungar, "Closing Time" by Leonard Cohen
 Bob Rock, "Bed of Roses" by Bon Jovi
 David Tyson, "Song Instead of a Kiss" and "Tumbleweed" by Alannah Myles
 Gino and Joe Vannelli, "Living Inside Myself" and "I Just Wanna Stop" by Gino Vannelli

Best Recording Engineer
Winner: Jeff Wolpert and John Whynot, "The Lady of Shallott" and The Visit by Loreena McKennitt

Other Nominees:

Canadian Music Hall of Fame
Winner: Anne Murray

Walt Grealis Special Achievement Award
Winner: Brian Robertson

Nominated and winning albums

Album of the Year
Winner: Ingénue, k.d. lang

Other Nominees:
 Celine Dion, Celine Dion
 Fully Completely, The Tragically Hip
 Gordon, Barenaked Ladies
 Lost Together, Blue Rodeo

Best Children's Album
Winner: Waves Of Wonder, Jack Grunsky

Other Nominees:
 Daydreams and Lullabies, Classical Kids, producer Susan Hammond
 If the Shoe Fits, Norman Foote
 Reves Multicolores, Carmen Campagne
 Something's Fishy at Camp Wiganishie, Al Simmons

Best Classical Album (Solo or Chamber Ensemble)
Winner: Beethoven: Piano Sonatas, Louis Lortie

Other Nominees:
 Brahms, Piano Music Vol. 2, Antonín Kubálek
 Lieder on Poems of Heinrich Heine, Kevin McMillian and Michael McMahon
 Schumann: Liederkreise, Catherine Robbin and Michael McMahon
 Songs of Hugo Wolf, Daniel Lichti and Arlene Shrut

Best Classical Album (Large Ensemble)
Winner: Handel: Excerpts From Floridante, Tafelmusik, with Alan Curtis, Catherine Robbin, Linda Maguire, Nancy Argenta, Ingrid Attrot, Mel Braun, leader Jeanne Lamon

Other Nominees:
 Haydn: Sumphonies Nos. 44, 51 and 52, Tafelmusik with Bruno Wolf, leader Jeanne Lamon
 Prokofiev: Alexander Novsky and Lieutenant Kike, Orchestre symphonique de Montreal, conductor Charles Dutoit
 Schumann and Chopin: Piano Concertos, Louis Lortie, the Philharmonia with Neeme Järvi
 Tchaikovsky: Swan Lake, Orchestre symphonique de Montreal, conductor Charles Dutoit

Best Album Design
Winner: Rebecca Baird and Kenny Baird, Lost Together by Blue Rodeo

Other Nominees:
 Rodney Bowes, Blame it on my Youth by Holly Cole Trio
 Brian McPhee and Tammie Lynn Presnal, Restless by Skydiggers
 John W. Stewart, Bull by Bootsauce
 Hugh Syme, Dear Dear by 54-40

Best Selling Album (Foreign or Domestic)
Winner: Waking Up the Neighbours, Bryan Adams

Other Nominees:
 Achtung Baby, U2
 Mad Mad World, Tom Cochrane
 Nevermind, Nirvana
 Some Gave All, Billy Ray Cyrus

Best Jazz Album
Winner: My Ideal, P.J. Perry

Other Nominees:
 Brassy and Sassy, Rob McConnell and The Boss Brass
 Last Call at the Blue Note, Oscar Peterson Trio
 Rectangle Man, John Stetch
 Time & Tide, Mike Murley

Best Selling Francophone Album
Winner: Dion Chante Plamondon, Celine Dion

Other Nominees:
 A contre-jour, Julie Masse
 Aux portes du matin, Richard Séguin
 Quand on se donne, Francis Martin

Note: Heading West, an album by Mitsou, was disqualified shortly after its nomination when Juno officials declared it had less than four-fifths of French lyrical content to qualify as a Francophone Album.

Hard Rock Album of the Year
Winner: Doin' the Nasty, Slik Toxik

Other Nominees:
 Angel Rat, Voivod
 Edge of Excess, Triumph
 Method to the Madness, Killer Dwarfs
 Sven Gali, Sven Gali

Best Roots & Traditional Album
Winner: Jusqu'aux p'tites heures, La Bottine Souriante

Other Nominees:
 Clawhammer Your Way to the Top, Daniel Koulack
 I Was Just Thinking That, Jackson Delta
 Moonlight Dancers, Bill Bourne and Alan MacLeod
 Where the Old Friends Meet, Ken Whiteley, Jackie Washington and Mose Scarlett

Nominated and winning releases

Single of the Year
Winner: "Beauty and the Beast", Céline Dion and Peabo Bryson

Other Nominees:
 "Enid", Barenaked Ladies
 "If You Asked Me To", Celine Dion
 "Song Instead of a Kiss", Alannah Myles
 "Thought I'd Died and Gone to Heaven", Bryan Adams

Best Classical Composition
Winner: "Concerto For Flute and Orchestra", R. Murray Schafer

Other Nominees:
 "The Darkly Splendid Earth: The Lonely Traveller", R. Murray Schafer
 "Kopernikus", Claude Vivier
 "Music to St cecilia for Organ and Strings", Jean Coulthard
 "Poulenc, Thesus", R. Murray Schafer

Best Selling Single (Foreign or Domestic)
Winner: "Achy Breaky Heart", Billy Ray Cyrus

Other Nominees:
 "Black or White", Michael Jackson
 "Jump", Kris Kross
 "Justified & Ancient", The KLF
 "Please Don't Go", KWS

Best Rap Recording
Winner: "Keep It Slammin'", Devon

Other Nominees:
 "Check the O.R.", Organized Rhyme
 "The Jungle Man", The Maximum Definitive
 Maestro Zone, Maestro Fresh-Wes
 Really Livin, Ragga Muffin Rascals

Best R&B/Soul RecordingWinner: Once In A Lifetime, Love & SasOther Nominees: "Don't Look Any Further", The Nylons
 "If That was a Dream", Lorraine Scott
 "Infatuated", Vivienne Williams
 "Power to the People", Debbie Johnson

Best World Beat RecordingWinner: Spirits Of Havana, Jane BunnettOther Nominees: All Over the World, Sattalites
 Invisible Minority, Salvador Ferreras
 Listen to the World, Kaleefah
 The Prodigal Son, Show-Do-Man

Best Dance RecordingWinner: "Love Can Move Mountains (Club Mix)", Celine DionOther Nominees: "C'mon and Get My Love (House Techno Remix)", Banned in the UK
 "Don't Stop Now (Prohibition Club Mix)", Love & Sas
 "Love Vibe (Love Vibe Club Mix)", Lisa Lougheed
 "World Love (Lisa Love House Mix)", Lisa Lougheed

Best VideoWinner: Curtis Wehrfritz, "Closing Time" by Leonard CohenOther Nominees:'
 Lyne Charlebois, "Bohemia" by Mae Moore
 Peter Henderson, "Locked in the Trunk of a Car" by The Tragically Hip
 Curtis Wehrfritz. "No Regrets" by Tom Cochrane
 Curtis Wehrfritz, "She La" by 54-40

References

External links
Juno Awards site

1993
1993 music awards
1993 in Canadian music
1993 in Ontario